is a Japanese judoka. Nabekura's favorite technique is Uchimata.

Judo career
Nabekura started practicing judo at the age of 5, following her two brothers.
She often beat Hifumi Abe when they were in elementary school. Abe says that experience "made him what he is".
In April 2010, Nabekura began studying at Taisei Junior High School. 
In August 2012, she won the National Junior High School Championships.
In April 2013, she graduated from middle school and went on to Taisei High School.
In March 2014, she won the National High School Championships.
In August 2015, she won the Inter-High School Championships.
In October 2015, Nabekura won the World Judo Championships Juniors both individual(–63 kg weight class) and team event.
In 2016, Nabekura became a member of the Judo club at the Mitsui Sumitomo Insurance Group.
In May 2017, she won the Asian Judo Championships.
In December 2017, she finished second at the Grand Slam Tokyo and the World Masters.
In August 2018, she won the Asian Games.

In 2021, she won the silver medal in her event at the 2021 Judo World Masters held in Doha, Qatar.

She won the gold medal in her event at the 2022 Judo Grand Slam Paris held in Paris, France.

References

External links
 

1997 births
Living people
Japanese female judoka
People from Hyōgo Prefecture
Judoka at the 2018 Asian Games
Asian Games gold medalists for Japan
Asian Games medalists in judo
Medalists at the 2018 Asian Games
21st-century Japanese women